Patrick Nagel (November 25, 1945 – February 4, 1984) was an American artist and illustrator. He created popular illustrations on board, paper, and canvas, most of which emphasize the female form in a distinctive style, descended from Art Deco and Pop art. He is best known for his illustrations for Playboy magazine and the pop music group Duran Duran, for whom he designed the cover of the best-selling album Rio,  which has been acclaimed as one of the greatest album covers of all time.

Early life and education 
Nagel was born in Dayton, Ohio, on November 25, 1945, but was raised and spent most of his life in the Los Angeles area. After serving in the United States Army with the 101st Airborne in Vietnam, Nagel attended the Chouinard Art Institute in Los Angeles in 1969, and in that same year he received his Bachelor of Fine Arts degree from California State University, Fullerton.

Career

Illustration and design 
In 1971, Nagel worked as a graphic designer for ABC Television, producing graphics for promotions and news broadcasts. The following year, he began work as a freelance artist for major corporations and magazines, including Architectural Digest, Harper's Magazine, IBM, ITT Corporation, MGM, Oui, Rolling Stone, United Artists, and Universal Studios.

Nagel produced album covers for recording artists such as Tommy James, Charlene, Thelma Houston and Cissy Houston. Nagel's 1982 painting for the album cover of rock group Duran Duran's hit album Rio became one of his better known images.

He worked for many commercial clients, including Intel, Lucky Strike cigarettes, Ballantine's Whiskey, and Budweiser.

Nagel contributed to Playboy magazine between August 1975 and July 1984, with one of his paintings being published in every issue, most notably in the Playboy Advisor, Playboy Forum and Playboy After Hours columns. This helped to improve his exposure to a wider audience and encouraged the popularity of "the Nagel Woman" image. He created roughly 285 pieces of art work for Playboy during his career. In the early part of his time with Playboy he was given very specific illustration instructions, but that ended sometime between 1977 and 1978; thereafter, Nagel chose his theme and approach and submitted his work for approval before publication. In 1993, roughly nine years after Nagel's death, his widow Jennifer Dumas went into litigation with Playboy over the rights to the artwork published in the magazine. See Playboy Enterprises, Inc. v. Dumas.

The Nagel woman 
In 1977, Nagel made his first poster image for Mirage Editions, with whom he printed many images, his most famous being those of "Nagel women." The "Nagel woman" was developed over time and increased in popularity after Nagel began publishing his work with Playboy in 1975. The women were drawn as "Nagel's ideal woman". His female figures tended to have black hair, and bright white skin. Nagel worked with many models, including Playboy Playmates Cathy St. George, Tracy Vaccaro and Shannon Tweed, and also painted several celebrity portraits, including those of Joan Collins and Joanna Cassidy.

There has been much discussion about the inspiration for Nagel's style; since little is known about Nagel's art background, there is no definite answer to this.

Art historians have speculated that he may have been influenced by Japanese-style art, but there is no specific evidence for that. His mapmaking experiences in Vietnam possibly did more to steer him into high contrast imagery than anything else.

Death and legacy

Death
Nagel died February 4, 1984, after participating in a 15-minute celebrity "aerobathon" to raise funds for the American Heart Association in Santa Monica. An autopsy determined his cause of death was a heart attack, and a further autopsy revealed that Nagel had a congenital heart defect that went undetected his entire life. He was survived by his wife, Jennifer Dumas, and his daughter from a previous marriage, Carole Nagel LaVigne. Against his parents' wishes and through no direction attributable to him, Patrick Nagel was cremated and his ashes scattered over the Pacific Ocean.

Legacy 
The passage of time has brought about a popular and critical reevaluation. "Completely recovered from his low period in the late '80s, his work now holds a place in the pop art tradition of Lichtenstein and Warhol," writes pop culture critic Jacob Shelton.
Nagel's works "capture the emotional state of an era: 1980s American desire, collective materialistic aspiration, a Less than Zero state of mind", said Alex Israel, whom Duran Duran hired to create the album art for their 2015 release Paper Gods, which visually references Nagel's famous Rio cover.

Art Market 
Nagel prints flooded the market in the 1980s. Nagel's manager, Karl Bornstein, president of Mirage Editions Inc., continued publication of Nagel's works after his death, including open edition prints and mass-market posters. In addition, in 1991, the FBI discovered and dismantled a counterfeiting ring which flooded the market with forged serigraphs. While this contributed to Nagel's cultural ubiquity—Nagel artwork was in a reported two million homes worldwide—it also served to exploit the brand and ultimately, dramatically lowered its value.

By 2019, the market showed signs of a comeback, with one of his original works from 1982 selling for $112,500 at auction, nearly doubling its estimated value, while limited-run silkscreen posters can go for several thousand dollars. Nagel has also had a resurgence in the form of collaborations with mass-market brands. In 2020, fast fashion retailer Forever 21 launched an apparel collection featuring Nagel portraits.

In popular culture 
 Grand Theft Auto: Vice City appropriated Nagel's visual style for its distinctive packaging and advertising campaign. The game became a cultural touchstone and the fastest-selling game in history at the time.

References

Further reading

External links 
 , with biography and selected works

1945 births
1984 deaths
20th-century American artists
American illustrators
Artists from California
Artists from Dayton, Ohio
People from Orange County, California
Playboy illustrators
Chouinard Art Institute alumni
California State University, Fullerton alumni
Album-cover and concert-poster artists